is a Japanese legendary figure of the Kofun period, also worshipped as the god of sweets. His name is written in kanji as 多遅麻毛理 in the Kojiki, and as 田道間守 in the Nihon Shoki.

Legendary narrative 
Tajimamori's ancestry is described differently in the Kojiki and Nihon Shoki.

Emperor Suinin commanded Tajimamori to go and get him a magical fruit called . However, by this time Emperor Suinin was already dead. Tajimamori gave half of his branches to Suinin's widow and offered the other half at the deceased emperor's tomb, then died himself, wailing with sadness.

Worship 
The fruit Tajimamori brought back is supposed in the records to be a tachibana. Tajimamori's role as god of sweets also originates in this story: the last character in the name of the fruit simply meant "fruit" at the time, but now refers to "sweets".

He is worshiped primarily by those involved in the confectionery industry.

Imari City in Saga Prefecture is traditionally considered the place where Tajimamori landed back in Japan, and  also worships him.

In popular culture 
Tajimamori is a character in Rin: Daughters of Mnemosyne and is voiced by Masahiko Tanaka.

References 

People of Kofun-period Japan
Japanese deities
Food deities
Deified Japanese people
Deified Japanese people in the Kiki